Blizhnyaya Kardanka is a rural locality (a village) in Ankhimovskoye Rural Settlement, Vytegorsky District, Vologda Oblast, Russia. The population was 2 as of 2002.

Geography 
Blizhnyaya Kardanka is located 13 km southeast of Vytegra (the district's administrative centre) by road. Belousovo is the nearest rural locality.

References 

Rural localities in Vytegorsky District